Cecil Frank Gribble (12 June 190315 September 1995) was an Australian Christian minister who was President General of the General Conference of the Methodist Church of Australasia 1964–1966.

Birth and early life
Gribble was born in Ballarat, Victoria, and trained as a pharmaceutical chemist. In 1924 he was accepted as a candidate for ministry and attended Queen's College (University of Melbourne). He Graduated with an MA (Hons) in 1931 and was ordained.

Clerical career
He had appointments to congregations in Alice Springs, Cobram, Shepparton, Hobart, and Launceston before Tonga. From 1939 until 1942 Gribble was Principal of  Tupou College and then from 1943 until 1945 he was Director of Education in Tonga. Within the Methodist Church in Australia he was Assistant General Secretary for Overseas Missions before becoming General Secretary. In 1958 he was the Australian representative at the World Conference of the International Missionary Council. In 1961 he was a delegate to the World Assemblies of the World Council of Churches at New Delhi and in 1968 at Uppsala. Gribble was Chairman of the Executive Committee of Newington College Council in 1964 and 1965. From 1974 until 1995 he was a supernumerary living on the northern beaches of Sydney.

Family and death
He was married to Isabel Overend the daughter of the Rev. & Mrs H.A. Overend in 1933. His wife predeceased him in 1985. They had two sons and one daughter. Gribble died while travelling in Taiwan. The Uniting Church in Australia parish at Dee Why, New South Wales, is named in his honour.

Honours
 1958: Officer of the Order of the British Empire (OBE)

References

1903 births
1995 deaths
Australian Methodist ministers
Uniting Church in Australia people
Australian Protestant religious leaders
Australian Knights Bachelor
Australian Officers of the Order of the British Empire
Members of Newington College Council
Australian expatriates in Tonga